Republica are an English alternative rock band formed in 1994. The height of their popularity spanned from 1996 to 1999. The current line-up consists of Saffron (vocals), Tim Dorney (keyboards), Johnny Male (guitar), Conor Lawrence (drums).

The Republica sound was described by the band as "technopop punk rock". The band went on hiatus in 2001 and reunited in 2008. Republica are best known for the single "Ready to Go".

History

Former Flowered Up keyboard player Tim Dorney and Andy Todd founded Republica. The Nigerian-born Saffron was an actress at one point, performing for two years in London's Starlight Express. She also appeared in the video for the Chesney Hawkes' hit "The One and Only" and in the video for N-Joi's single "Mindflux". She was also lead vocalist on N-Joi's hit "Anthem" in 1990.

Republica released the first single "Out of This World" in 1994, followed by the single "Bloke" in March 1995. In April 1996, their single "Ready to Go" became their first to chart on the UK Singles Chart, when it reached Number 43. Their debut album Republica was released in July 1996 and reached No. 4 in the UK Albums Chart after being re-issued in 1997. The band added Johnny Male, formally of early 1990s One Little Indian act Soul Family Sensation, as an official member on guitar, with "Ready to Go" remixed as more a rock-sounding dance track. This version became their signature single and reached No. 13. The fourth single, "Drop Dead Gorgeous", reached No. 7.

The group attracted positive press coverage. Emerging after a wave of female-fronted rock bands (such as Elastica, Lush, Sleeper, Echobelly and Kenickie), they had, like Curve and Garbage, a notably more aggressive and electronic sound.

In 1997, they contributed a cover of "Are 'Friends' Electric?" to the Gary Numan tribute album Random. That same year, Saffron performed vocals for the Prodigy's "Fuel My Fire" from their album The Fat of the Land.

The second album, Speed Ballads, was released in 1998 and reached No. 37 in UK Albums Chart. Its lead single, "From Rush Hour With Love", peaked at No. 20 in UK Singles Chart. The band suffered when their label, Deconstruction Records, folded shortly after the release of Speed Ballads. Deconstruction's back catalogue was swallowed up by BMG and Speed Ballads was never released in the United States. In 2001, Republica went on hiatus. On their official site it was posted the message "Republica are not recording at this time". In 2002 BMG released the compilation Ready to Go: The Best Of against the band's wishes.

After the band went on hiatus, Saffron worked with the Cure, appearing on the single "Just Say Yes" from their Greatest Hits album. She also collaborated with Junkie XL for his 2003 album Radio JXL: A Broadcast from the Computer Hell Cabin. In September 2008, Republica reunited at Windsor at a Contra Mundum concert. They played "Ready to Go", "Drop Dead Gorgeous" and a cover of "You Got the Love".

In early 2010, Republica performed a string of gigs. They also issued a remixed version of "Ready to Go" entitled "Ready to Go 2010". In June 2010 the remix was released and reached No. 1 on the Upfront Club chart. The track has been produced by Andy Gray and Alan Moulder. In October 2010, the band performed a comeback gig at O2 Academy Islington followed by several dates in Eastern Europe and the Middle East in 2011. They performed at GuilFest in July 2012.

The band released a new EP, Christiana Obey, and also recorded a session for Brentwood radio station Phoenix FM in April 2013. A joint 20th anniversary tour with the band Space took place in the spring of 2014. In October and early November 2014, Republica toured the UK in support of the Boomtown Rats "Ratlife" tour and took the opportunity to premiere some new material. Friday 29 May 2015 saw the public debut of more new material when Republica performed at the "Under The Bridge" venue in Chelsea, London, with support from Tenek and Kenelis. A deluxe edition of Republica was released on 28 February 2020 on Cherry Red Records.

In 2023, the band will be re-releasing Speed Ballads on vinyl and also releasing their third studio album, Damaged Gods.

Notes

Members

Current line-up
 Saffron (Samantha Sprackling, born 3 June 1968, Ibadan, Nigeria) – vocals, tambourine (1994–2001, 2008–present)
 Tim Dorney (born 30 March 1965, Ascot, Berkshire) – keyboards, programming, piano (1994–2001, 2008–present)
 Johnny Male (born 10 October 1963, Windsor, Berkshire) – guitar, backing vocals (formerly of One Little Indian Records's Soul Family Sensation and Sensation) (1994–2001, 2008–present)
 Conor Lawrence – drums (2012–present)

Former members
 Pete Riley – drums (1998–2001)
 Andy Todd – keyboards, acoustic guitar, backing vocals (1994–1997)
 David Barbarossa – drums (formerly of Bow Wow Wow, and Adam and the Ants) (1994–1997)
 Alix Tiernan – percussion (1994–1995)
 Mick Pirie – bass guitar (1994–1995)
 Timm Hamm – bass guitar (2013–2015) later a member of Future Eyes, Steelheart, Geronimo 7, Imposchine, and Wirerims
 Nigel Champion – drums (2008–2012)

Side projects and collaborations
 Saffron performed vocals for the Prodigy's "Fuel My Fire" from their 1997 album The Fat of the Land.
 Saffron wrote and performed vocals for Deepsky's "Smile" from their 2002 album In Silico. 
 Saffron recorded the songs "Crusher", "Spirits", and "Beauty Never Fades" on Junkie XL's 2003 album Radio JXL: A Broadcast from the Computer Hell Cabin.
 In 2001 Saffron worked with the Cure on the single "Just Say Yes" for their Greatest Hits. She also featured in "Just Say Yes" video.
 Dorney briefly reunited with fellow former Flowered Up band member Liam Maher, but they split up in late 2002. Flowered Up tried to re-form in 2007 but Dorney refused, causing the cancellation of a planned reunion tour. He worked as a painter and decorator, and on Contra Mundum with Male releases in 2008 on the White Label.
 Male co-wrote tracks for Lipslide, the 1997 solo album by Sarah Cracknell of Saint Etienne. He has also featured in cult band Go Kart Mozart.
 Todd continued as a songwriter, and co-wrote "Reach" by S Club 7, and has also worked with Kylie Minogue. He now operates between his recording studios in London and the Caribbean.

Discography

Studio albums

Compilation albums

Live albums

Extended plays

Singles

Music videos
 "Bloke", 1995
 "Ready to Go" (original mix), 1996
 "Ready to Go" (Ben Grosse mix), 1997
 "Drop Dead Gorgeous", 1997
 "From Rush Hour with Love" (version 1), 1998
 "From Rush Hour with Love" (version 2), 1998
 "Try Everything", 1998
 "Christiana Obey", 2013

See also
 List of alternative music artists

References

External links 

 
 Allmusic entry for Republica
 Photos from 2013 tour

Alternative dance musical groups
English rock music groups
Musical groups established in 1994
Musical groups disestablished in 2001
Musical groups reestablished in 2008
Musical groups from Berkshire
English alternative rock groups
English synth-pop groups
Dance-punk musical groups
Female-fronted musical groups
Britpop groups